The following is a list of political parties whose names (in English) could be referred to as Convergence Party.

Convergence (Mexico), a political party in Mexico
Democratic Convergence Party (Cape Verde)
Democratic Convergence Party-Reflection Group in São Tomé and Príncipe
Convergence and Union, a coalition of two political parties in Catalonia, Spain
Democratic Convergence of Catalonia, a political party in Catalonia, Spain
Convergence for Social Democracy, a political party in Equatorial Guinea
Anti-Capitalist Convergence, a group of political organizations
National Convergence, a political party in Venezuela